A matchday programme or match programme is a booklet associated with a live sporting event which details the proposed starting lineup and other details of the match. To some spectators, the purchase of a matchday programme is part of the "ritual" of attending football and hurling matches in Britain and Ireland. Until 2018, the printing of matchday programmes was compulsory for English Football League games.

Souvenir programmes are also collected as sports memorabilia, and rare FA Cup Final matchday programmes have fetched in excess of £35,000 at auction houses such as Sotheby's. Matchday programmes from early 20th-century hurling and Gaelic football games are also collected in Ireland, and a programme from the 1913 All-Ireland Senior Hurling Championship Final was sold at auction in 2018 for more than €2,000.

Association football
A tradition from attending a football match in Britain is to purchase a football programme along with a pint and/or a pie. Due to their initial expendable nature (like the ticket) it took many decades for the format to gain respectability as a collectible. Collecting football programmes became a common hobby among fans in Britain during the 1960s and from then on a number of specialist dealers began to appear. Merseyside team Everton were the first association football club in Britain to produce regular matchday programmes.

History

The programme started life around the late 1880s as a scorecard which would have been a single card or sheet with dateline, team names and player positions. West Midlands team Aston Villa were one of the first clubs to publish a programme with their The Villa News and Record, which from the outset almost encouraged collecting as it was in the form of a journal with a different number and volume for each season and week respectively; by 1946, for instance, it was up to number 33. Of real interest for the collector, however, has always been the FA Cup Final programme; over the years there have been many attractive covers and the design often reflecting the age, with the late 1920s and 1930s examples bearing Art Deco style, for example.

Programmes from the 1940s and early 1950s are rarer due to recycling for paper shortages as part of the war effort and times of post-war austerity. The size of the programmes increased over the decades from a smaller pocket size to a larger A4 size, but a number of clubs in the early 21st century have reverted to more convenient sizes. The FA Cup Final has, however, retained its larger size (even acknowledging this by coming with a customary carrier bag in recent years).

Modern programmes have far more pages than their earlier four or eight-page predecessors and are generally full colour and glossy. With the logistics and requirements of modern production (programmes are often printed beyond a club's locality, for example), the product has long been of little help in accuracy of the "field of play", although the advent of squad numbers has at least ensured the likelihood of all names being present. The programme for Duncan Edwards's debut for North West team Manchester United in the early 1950s for example does not bear his name at all.

In June 2018, clubs in the English Football League voted to end the requirement for programmes to be produced for every game.

Notable programmes and collecting
Some clubs have a programme shop for collectors, however eBay is also used as a source for collectors.

One of the most sought-after of all programmes is the 1966 FIFA World Cup Final. There have been at least two reprints — with the original being heavier than the reprints at 130 grams — and the inside advert for Player's No. 6 is different. The blue of the Union Flag on the cover is darker too.

The programme for the first ever FA Cup Final held in Wembley in 1923 is rarer than the 1966 programme, and would typically cost over £1000; similarly the 1927 one is much sought after as it was the first and so far only time that the Cup "left England", being won by Welsh team Cardiff City.

The most expensive Wembley FA Cup Final programme by far, is the 1924 edition, as few remain; the game was played in torrential rain and fans used their programmes as part of their effort to cover themselves against the weather. The programme has reached £4,500 on the few occasions on which it has been offered at auction.

Among the most notable club programmes in association football is the example printed in February 1958 for the FA Cup game between Manchester United and Sheffield Wednesday. This was Manchester United's first game after the Munich air disaster and, out of respect, their team layout was left blank.

A football programme from the 1882 FA Cup Final between Blackburn Rovers and Old Etonians sold at auction for a world record of £35,250. The programme was sold by Sotheby's in May 2013 to Old Etonians Football Club. The previous record for a football programme was for the 1909 FA Cup Final contested between Manchester United and Bristol City. It was sold on 15 May 2012 for £23,500 at Sotheby's by Graham Budd Auctions.

The programme for the 1973 European Cup Final between Ajax and Juventus is also rare, with only 400 produced.

Gaelic football
The Gaelic Athletic Association (GAA) produces a matchday programme for every game in the All-Ireland Senior Football Championship. Photographs, prints and posters of past programmes are available to buy from the Croke Park shop. The official matchday programme for the 2020 All-Ireland Senior Football Championship Final (held behind closed doors due to the COVID-19 pandemic) was made available in physical form for supporters ahead of the game, either online (via an emailed PDF and follow-up copy send through the postal system) or to purchase at SuperValu and Centra outlets in the competing counties.

Home teams produce matchday programmes for National Football League games.

County boards, such as Kerry GAA, also produce matchday programmes for their own local competitions.

Hurling
The Gaelic Athletic Association (GAA) produces a matchday programme for every game in the All-Ireland Senior Hurling Championship. Photographs, prints and posters of past programmes are available to buy from the Croke Park shop.

Home teams produce matchday programmes for National Hurling League games.

A matchday programme from the 1913 All-Ireland Senior Hurling Championship Final sold at auction in Kilkenny for more than €2,000 in 2018.

The GAA said sorry after forgetting to include Clare in the 2022 All-Ireland Senior Hurling Championship Final matchday programme's "roll of honour section".

Rugby
Matchday programmes for rugby games are also produced and collected. A programme from a Grand Slam decider, contested by Wales and Ireland in the 1911 Five Nations Championship, was sold in 2009 for £2,400.

References

Advertising publications by format
Programme
Programme
Programme
Programme
Programme
Programme